Gloria Dawn (26 February 1929 – 2 April 1978) was an Australian actress, choreographer singer and vaudevillian performer. She was one of the leading stars of the stage from the 1950s to her death.

Early life
Dawn was born in Port Melbourne, Victoria, the only daughter of theatrical agent William Edward Evans and Zilla Emma Edith Odling, a native of Thailand. Both her parents were vaudeville performers, known as "Billy and Weatherly", and she toured with them, appearing on stage from infancy and doing Shirley Temple impersonations. At 12 Dawn was one of the Tivoli Gang of juvenile stars, performing in the Crazy Show at the Tivoli Theatre.  She also began playing soubrette on stage, in shows such as the Naughty Nineties at the Tivoli.

Career
Dawn made ge=he debut in theatre in 1935 and featured in everything from pantomime, cabaret, vaudeville, revue and musical and comedy drama. In 1949 she was the star of the show, Sunny, at the Cremorne Theatre in Brisbane.  

In the 1950s, as the queen of revue, she appeared in productions such as Once Upon a Mattress and C.J. Dennis' iconic The Sentimental Bloke and A Cup of Tea, a Bex and a Good Lie Down. In the 1970s stage roles included The Slaughter House of St. Theresa Day, Mother Courage and A Hard God. According to The Canberra Times, Dawn "won the greatest acclaim of her career for the leading role in Gypsy, a musical based on the life of stripper Gypsy Rose Lee". 

In 1977, several months before she died, she appeared on Graham Kennedy's Blankety Blanks.

Her film credits include They're a Weird Mob in 1966 The Mango Tree in 1977.

Personal life
Dawn married variety artist Francis Patrick Cleary in Brisbane on 15 January 1947 and had four children. They separated in 1970.

She died from cancer at the King George V Hospital in Camperdown, Sydney on 2 April 1978.

References

External links
Australian theatre credits at AusStage

Gloria Dawn at Australian Dictionary of Biography
Gloria Dawn  at Live Performance Hall of Fame

Australian stage actresses
20th-century Australian actresses
1929 births
1978 deaths
Deaths from cancer in New South Wales
Actresses from Melbourne